Hector de Lima Carrilla (born 26 October 1947) is a Venezuelan sports shooter. He competed in the men's 50 metre free pistol event at the 1984 Summer Olympics.

References

1947 births
Living people
Venezuelan male sport shooters
Olympic shooters of Venezuela
Shooters at the 1984 Summer Olympics
Place of birth missing (living people)
Pan American Games medalists in shooting
Pan American Games gold medalists for Venezuela
Pan American Games bronze medalists for Venezuela
Shooters at the 1971 Pan American Games
Shooters at the 1983 Pan American Games
Medalists at the 1983 Pan American Games
20th-century Venezuelan people
21st-century Venezuelan people